Kalma Chowk (Urdu) is a famous town square and road intersection in Lahore, Punjab, Pakistan. It is one of the busiest intersections in terms of traffic. Kalma Chowk Flyover passes over it. It is the intersection of the main roads of Ferozepur Road, Main Boulevard Garden Town and Main Boulevard Gulberg. It is a combination of a two way flyover and a two way heavy duty underpass connecting Garden Town and Gulberg.

References

Nawaz Sharif administration
Streets in Lahore
Squares in Pakistan
Tourist attractions in Lahore
Road junctions in Pakistan